Juraj Njavro (2 July 1938 – 15 September 2008) was a Croatian medical doctor and politician.

Njavro was born in Cerovica, near Neum in the Kingdom of Yugoslavia (today part of Bosnia and Herzegovina). He attended elementary school here and gymnasium in Dubrovnik, Croatia.

He served as a surgeon Vukovar's hospital during the city's intense siege within the Croatian War of Independence. He continued to work in the hospital right up until the fall of the city to Serb forces. Njavro was subsequently imprisoned and taken to the Sremska Mitrovica camp in Serbia. In late 1991 Njavro was released as part of a prisoner exchange.

He took part in Croatia's first post-independence parliamentary elections in 1992 and was elected as a member of the Croatian Democratic Union. From August 12, 1992 to October 12, 1993 he served as Croatia's Minister of Health. He served as a minister without portfolio from October 12, 1993 to November 7, 1995, won reelection in 1995, and served again without portfolio from November 13, 1996 to December 19, 1997. From December 19, 1997 to January 27, 2000 he served as Minister of Defenders from the Homeland War. He was reelected again in 2000 and retired in 2003.

Njavro wrote a book about his internment during the war entitled Glava dolje, ruke na leđa. After his retirement he served as the president of the Association of Croatian volunteer doctors 1990–1991.

He died on September 15, 2008 in Zagreb and was buried in the city's Mirogoj Cemetery.

References

1938 births
2008 deaths
People from Neum
Croatian Democratic Union politicians
Croatian surgeons
Politicians of the Croatian War of Independence
Representatives in the modern Croatian Parliament
Burials at Mirogoj Cemetery
Veterans' affairs ministers of Croatia
School of Medicine, University of Zagreb alumni
Health ministers of Croatia
20th-century surgeons